Tasmania Zoo is a zoo located in Launceston, in the Australian state of Tasmania. Tasmania Zoo is a fully accredited member of the Zoo and Aquarium Association, working closely with all Australasian zoos, and are involved in various species management programs.

History 

The zoo was opened in 2003 by Richard Warren and daughter Rochelle Penney. Warren created the Tasmania Zoo as a "legacy to Tasmania" to educate the community. His daughter said about her father after his death in 2018, he "had a special affinity for animals who were on the endangered list. “'He wanted to create the zoo so he could show these exotic and endangered animals and people from Tasmania could see them right here in the state.... Over the past 15 years, Dad’s small fauna park has grown from native wildlife to now include exotic and threatened species and participates in formal conservation programs'".

Exhibits & Species 

Exhibits include Tasmanian devils, bare-nosed wombats,  Sumatran tigers, African lions, servals, caracals, quolls, emus, koalas, eastern grey kangaroos, reptiles and monkeys. They exhibit the second largest collection of primates in any private zoo in Australia. Along with over 100 other species & 1000 individual animals. Conservation work carried out by the zoo includes a breeding program for Tasmanian devils called Devil's Heaven.

The first red panda for Tasmania arrived at the zoo in 2017. Mandu was born in 2015 at the Melbourne Zoo.

In 2018 the zoo received sibling Sumatran tigers, Cinta and Jalur. The pair had lived in Symbio Wildlife Park in Sydney since they were two-years old, they celebrated their tenth birthday before leaving Symbio Park. The Tasmanian Zoo head keeper, Emma Morgan said that they had been preparing for their arrival for a long time. The winters are colder in Tasmania than Sydney, "They do have nice heated dens, comfy beds and they have a nice thick coat as well." Morgan says that the zoo has housed large cats before and are prepared.

On Christmas day 2019 the zoo received three golden lion tamarins, Fraggle, Mokey and Olmec. Native to Brazil, these monkeys came from Mogo Zoo in New South Wales. The three are all male, but as they are an endangered species the zoo hopes to receive a female for breeding.

Sister cheetahs Zari and Tafara were new additions to the zoo in January 2020. The zoo had built an enclosure in 2012 and finally has residents. The cheetahs came from Monarto Zoo in South Australia.

In October 2020 the zoo unveiled an electronic tyrannosaurus rex that had been housed at the Queen Victoria Museum. The t-rex weighs 700 kilograms and was too large to travel when the Queen Victoria Museum exhibit moved to New Zealand.

In October 2021, an 18 month old male snow leopard named Sikari arrived at the zoo.

The zoo is available for birthday parties and private events. Animal encounters and "adoptions" of animals are also available.

Animals at the zoo include:

Birds

Australian king parrot
Blue and yellow macaw
Blue-winged parrot
Bourke’s parrot
Budgerigar
Bush stone curlew
Canary
Cape Barren goose
Carnaby’s black cockatoo
Chestnut-eared finch
Cockatiel
Eastern rosella
Eclectus parrot
Emu
Gang-gang cockatoo
Golden pheasant
Green cheeked conure
Green rosella
Grey parrot
Hahn’s macaw
Helmeted guineafowl
Hooded parrot
Indian rose-ringed parakeet
Jandaya parakeet
Japanese quail
Kakariki
King quail
Laughing kookaburra
Little corella
Little penguin
Lovebirds
Major Mitchell’s cockatoo
Mallee ringneck parrot
Mandarin duck
Moustached parakeet
Northern rosella
Parrotfinch
Princess parrot
Red-rumped parrot
Southern cassowary
Star finch
Sulphur-crested cockatoo
Sun conure
Superb parrot
Swift parrot
Tawny frogmouth
Turquoise parrot
Western long-billed corella
Western rosella
Yellow-tailed black cockatoo

Mammals

African lion
African wild dog
Alpaca
Bare-nosed wombat
Bennett’s wallaby
Black-capped capuchin monkey
Black crested macaque
Caracal
Cheetah
Cotton-top tamarin
Crab-eating macaque
Dromedary camel
Eastern grey kangaroo
Eastern quoll
Emperor tamarin
European fallow deer
Giraffe
Golden lion tamarin
Greater capybara
Guinea pig
Javan binturong
Koala
Mandrill
Meerkat
Miniature donkey
Northern white-cheeked gibbon
Pygmy marmoset
Red panda
Red-handed tamarin
Ring-tailed lemur
Serval
Short-beaked echidna
Siamang
Snow leopard
Spotted-tailed quoll
Sumatran tiger
Tasmanian brushtail possum (golden-coated morph)
Tasmanian devil
Tasmanian ringtail possum
White-tufted marmoset

Reptiles

American alligator
Black-headed python
Black tiger snake
Freshwater crocodile
Inland Children's python
Jungle carpet python
Northern Territory carpet python
Saltwater crocodile
Spotted python

The zoo also keeps and exhibits Australian lungfish.

Devil facial tumour disease

In 2005 Warren built twenty "off-display enclosures and housed 20 orphaned baby Tasmanian devils. The devils were orphaned by parents who had succumbed to devil facial tumour disease". According to Penney, the zoo "[W]as the first wildlife establishment to work with [the] Department of Primary Industries, Water and Environment in the fight against Devil Facial Tumour Disease. This special population of devils not only remained disease-free but have bred successfully every year since and contribute their important genes'".

In 2012 the zoo was awarded a $28,394 grant from The University of Tasmania Foundation to improve food preparation for Tasmanian devil insurance populations. Warren said "that the money would be used to establish a full-time food storage and preparation area with walk-in freezer, allowing the facility to increase the capacity of its Devils' Haven area by a further 20 breeding animals".

2012 intrusion
On 2 August 2012, an intrusion occurred at the zoo, and the entrances to about thirty enclosures were opened. Dozens of animals, some endangered, escaped. The intruders also killed about a dozen birds, including a Tasmanian swift parrot, fewer than 1,000 of which remain in the wild. The park's population of quolls was released, but the Tasmanian devils were not harmed. Penney was concerned that if not found, many of the animals would die: "A lot of our animals are in captivity for a reason. They won't survive on their own." The zoo does not receive government funding and Penney estimated that replacing each of the birds would cost up to 2,000 Australian dollars.

Funding during COVID-19 lockdown

In March 2020 the zoo was forced to close to visitors for the first time in its seventeen year history. The zoo does not receive government funding, relying on attendance numbers, donations and corporate sponsorships. The zoo "receives unused produce from Woolworths Supermarkets and Coles Supermarkets as part their farmer's programs". According to Penney, "'But when you're looking at our carnivores like our tigers, lions or our newly-arrived cheetahs ... the food bill for those guys alone is enormous'". The zoo does not have the money to pay wages, but the zoo houses over 1,500 animals that need to be cared for. Penney says "'I'm lucky to have an amazing team of zookeepers here who are now volunteering so we can get through this'". It's uncertain if the government was going to help fund the zoo during the lockdown. One area of concern is that the Tasmanian Devils were starting to enter their breeding season which requires a lot of monitoring by the zookeepers. A donation link was set up to help out the park.

References

External links
 
 

2003 establishments in Australia
Zoos established in 2003
Zoos in Tasmania
Parks in Tasmania